Polnareff is a surname. Notable people with the surname include:

 Jean Pierre Polnareff, fictional character from the Japanese manga JoJo's Bizarre Adventure
 Michel Polnareff (born 1944), French singer-songwriter